The U Sports men's volleyball championship is an annual tournament that features the top eight men's volleyball teams from among competing Canadian universities in U Sports. 11 games are played over a period of three days culminating in a national championship being awarded. The champion is awarded the Tantramar Trophy, named after the Tantramar Marshes in New Brunswick, which was donated in 1967 by Mount Allison University. The 2023 champions are the Trinity Western Spartans, who have won seven championships in program history. The Manitoba Bisons and Winnipeg Wesmen have won the most championships with both schools having won ten times.

History
The first championship tournament was held in Calgary, Alberta and featured the UBC Thunderbirds defeating the Mount Allison Mounties 3–0 and the Sherbrooke Vert et Or 3–0 en route to being the first CIAU men's volleyball champions. While early records are not readily available, the championship has been played as a round-robin tournament at least since 1980. In 1983, six teams played in two pools and then, based on the results, advanced to single-elimination games to determine a winner. In 1985, the current format of full single-elimination games was adopted with eight team competing in the tournament. The 2020 and 2021 championship tournaments were cancelled due to the COVID-19 pandemic.

Format
The championship currently consists of an eight-team tournament, with champions from each of the three conferences, one host (from Canada West in 2020 and 2021), an additional Canada West team, two additional OUA teams, and one additional team from the RSEQ. While the berths for the conference champions and host remain consistent year-to-year, the other four invitees can change based on the host's conference and the competitive landscape in U Sports. The championship takes place over three days and features 11 games, with teams seeded 1–8. Teams are ranked by a committee as well as by the ELO ranking used to determine weekly Top 10 rankings nationally. Conference champions can be ranked no lower than 6th place. The team ranked 1st plays the 8th ranked team, 2nd plays 7th, 3rd plays 6th, and 4th plays 5th in the quarter-finals. To ensure common rest times, teams are not re-seeded after the first round, so the winner of 1v8 plays the winner of 4v5 and the winner of 2v7 plays the winner of 3v6. There is also a consolation bracket to determine the third-place winner (bronze medalist) and fifth-place winner. The gold medal game is the last game played in the tournament.

Results

Round Robin Format (1967–1982)

Transition Format (1983–1984)

Single Elimination Format (1985–present)

Top 3 finishes table
Due to information limitations, the following table includes all known first, second, and third-place finishes, as indicated above. Prior to 1983, there were no third-place finishes, and the second-place finish was the loser of the championship game. While the Dalhousie Tigers now play in the RSEQ, they had won their medals while playing in the AUS conference, which no longer fields men's volleyball teams.

External links
U Sports Men's Volleyball Championship

References

U Sports trophies
National volleyball leagues
Volleyball in Canada
U Sports volleyball